Guillermo Pérez Roldán defeated Jay Berger 3–2 after Berger retired to win the 1987 Buenos Aires Grand Prix singles competition. Berger was the defending champion.

Seeds

  Martín Jaite (quarterfinals)
  Guillermo Pérez Roldán (champion)
  Eduardo Bengoechea (second round)
  Ronald Agénor (first round)
  Jay Berger (final)
  Horst Skoff (second round)
  Alberto Tous (first round)
  Ricki Osterthun (first round)

Draw

Finals

Top half

Bottom half

External links
 1987 ATP Buenos Aires Singles draw

Singles
ATP